The American Women's League Chapter House was built in 1910 by a local contractor, from plans with Prairie School and Bungalow/Craftsman influences designed by St. Louis architects Helfensteller, Hirsch & Watson.  It was listed on the National Register of Historic Places in 1986.

It was deemed significant for its association with the American Women's League and for serving "for over 70 years as a center for women's civic and cultural activities within the community."

References

History of women in Montana
Prairie School architecture in Montana
Bungalow architecture in Montana
Buildings and structures completed in 1910
Women's club buildings
Clubhouses on the National Register of Historic Places in Montana
National Register of Historic Places in Powell County, Montana
American Woman's League
1910 establishments in Montana